The Prior of Oronsay was the Religious Superior of Oronsay Priory, a community of canons regular on the island of Oronsay, Inner Hebrides, off the coast of Scotland. It was in existence by 1353, perhaps founded by John of Islay, Lord of the Isles.

It is probable that most of the priors have not come down to us by name. The last known prior was Robert Lamont, elected in 1555. After the Scottish Reformation in 1560, the lands and property of the priory was given in commendam to Maol Choluim MacDubhthaich ("Malcolm MacDuffie"), at which time it would appear that the community ceased to exist.

The property was later given to the Bishop of the Isles by King James VI of Scotland upon his ascendency to the throne in 1583.

List of priors and commendators

List of known priors
 ???, fl. 1353
 Martin, x 1362
 Maurice de Oronsay, 1362-1382 x 1396
 Domhnall MacMhuirich, 1397-1426
 Dúghall MacEain (Dugall McKane), 1426-1472
 Dúghall MacDomhnaill (Donaldi), 1472
 Domhnall "Macyroull", 1499
 Domhnall MacPháil, 1538
 Domhnall MacDubhtaich (Donald MacDuffie or MacFee), 1538-1554
 Eoin MacMhuirich, 1554-1558
 Robert Lamont, 1555

List of known commendators
 Maol Choluim MacDubhthaich (Malcolm MacDuffie or Macilfie), 1561-1583

See also
 Oronsay Priory

References
 Cowan, Ian B. & Easson, David E., Medieval Religious Houses: Scotland With an Appendix on the Houses in the Isle of Man, Second edition, (London, 1976), p. 94
 Watt, D. E. R. & Shead, N. F. (eds.), The Heads of Religious Houses in Scotland from the 12th to the 16th Centuries, The Scottish Records Society, New Series, Volume 24, (Edinburgh, 2001), pp. 165–7

Oronsay
Oronsay